Danilo Donati (6 April 1926 - 1 December 2001) was an Italian costume designer and production designer. He won the Academy Award for Best Costume Design twice: the first time for his work in Romeo and Juliet (1968), the second time for his work in Fellini's Casanova (1976). In addition, he received numerous David di Donatello and Nastro d'Argento awards for his costume and production designs in various films. 
 
Among the film directors with whom Donati had worked were Federico Fellini and Pier Paolo Pasolini.

Filmography

Costume designer
 La grande guerra (1959)
 Il carro armato dell'8 settembre (1960)
 Adua e le compagne (1960)
 Vanina Vanini (1961)
 La steppa (1962)
 La cuccagna (1962)
 Chi lavora è perduto (1963)
 Ro.Go.Pa.G. (1963)
 La bella di Lodi (1963)
 Il comandante (1963)
 Scanzonatissimo (1963)
 Il Vangelo secondo Matteo (1964)
 Madamigella di Maupin (1966)
 The Mandrake (1965)
 El Greco (1966)
 Uccellacci e uccellini (1966)
 Edipo re (1967)
 The Taming of the Shrew (1967)
 Romeo and Juliet (1968)
 La cintura di castità (1968)
 Satyricon (1969)
 Pigsty (1969)
 La monaca di Monza (1969)
 L'amante di Gramigna (1969)
 Il Decameron (1970)
 Per grazia ricevuta (1971)
 Brother Sun Sister Moon (1972)
 I racconti di Canterbury (1972)
 Roma (1972)
 Fratello sole, sorella luna (1972)
 Amarcord (1973)
 Il fiore delle mille e una notte (1974)
 Salò o le 120 giornate di Sodoma (1975)
 Fellini's Casanova (1976)
 Gran bollito (1977)
 Caligula (1979)
 Hurricane (1979)
 Flash Gordon (1980)
 Red Sonja (1985)
 Momo (1986)
 Ginger e Fred (1986)
 Intervista (1987)
 Francesco (1989)
 Il Mostro (1994)
 I magi randagi (1996)
 Nostromo (1996) (TV mini-series)
 La vita è bella (1997)
 Jérusalem (2000) (TV)
 Pinocchio (2002)

Production designer
 Roma (1972)
 Amarcord (1973)
 Gran bollito (1977)
 Hurricane (1979)
 Flash Gordon (1980)
 Red Sonja (1985)
 Momo (1986)
 Intervista (1987)
 Francesco (1989)
 Vendetta: Secrets of a Mafia Bride (1991) (TV)
 C'è Kim Novak al telefono (1994)
 I magi randagi (1996)
 La vita è bella (1997)
 Marianna Ucrìa (1997)
 Jérusalem (2000) (TV)
 Pinocchio (2002)
  (2006)

External links 

Italian costume designers
Italian production designers
1926 births
2001 deaths
People from the Province of Mantua
David di Donatello winners
Ciak d'oro winners
Best Costume Design Academy Award winners
Best Costume Design BAFTA Award winners
Best Production Design BAFTA Award winners